Pavino is the name of several rural localities in Russia:
Pavino (selo), Kostroma Oblast, a selo in Pavinskoye Settlement of Pavinsky District of Kostroma Oblast
Pavino (village), Kostroma Oblast, a village in Pavinskoye Settlement of Pavinsky District of Kostroma Oblast
Pavino, Novosibirsk Oblast, a settlement in Novosibirsky District of Novosibirsk Oblast
Pavino, Sakhalin Oblast, a selo in Kholmsky District of Sakhalin Oblast